The Apollo is a former French music-hall venue located at 20 rue de Clichy in the 9th arrondissement of Paris.

History 
The Apollo Theatre had a removable stage (now destroyed) called basculo conceived by the engineer Félix Léon Edoux.

In 1909 the Czech conductor and composer, Ludvík Čelanský, was artistic director and head of the symphony orchestra of the Apollo.

The actress Jane Marnac, her husband Keith Trevor, and Camille Wyn directed the Apollo in 1929 and 1930.

The Merry Widow (Franz Lehár) and Rêve de Valse (Oscar Straus) were premiered in the theatre. In addition, Carlos Gardel, Argentinian tango singer, made his Parisian debut here.

Repertoire 
 1913 : La Jeunesse dorée, operetta by Henri Verne, music Marcel Lattès, with André Lefaur
 1914 : La Fille de Figaro by Maurice Hennequin and Hugues Delorme, music Xavier Leroux, with Jane Marnac
 1918 : La Reine joyeuse (new title of La Reine s'amuse), operetta by André Barde, music Charles Cuvillier, with Jane Marnac  
 1925 : Bouche à bouche, operetta by Maurice Yvain, libretto by André Barde, with Georges Milton
 1929 : Le Procès de Mary Dugan by Bayard Veiller, adaptation Henry Torrès and Horace de Carbuccia, with Harry Baur
 1929 : Dans la rue, after Street Scene by Elmer Rice, adaptation Francis Carco, with Marguerite Moreno
 1929 : Shangaï de Charles Méré after John Colton, with Jane Marnac
 1930 : Au temps des valses de Noël Coward, adaptation Saint-Granier, with Jane Marnac
 1932 : Hector by Henri Decoin 
 1932 :  Papavert  by Chas.k.Gordon and Loic le Gouriadec after the work by George Froeschel 
 1943 : La Dame de minuit by Jean de Létraz, directed by Denis d'Inès
 1944 : Mademoiselle Antoinette by Jean Guitton
 1945 : L'Autre Aventure by Marcel Haedrich, directed by Jacques Erwin
 1946 : La Nuit du 16 janvier by Ayn Rand, directed by Jacques Baumer
 1946 : Un homme sans amour by Paul Vialar, directed by Fernand Ledoux, with Jean Chevrier, Marguerite Pierry
 1946 : Un amour fou de Jean Guitton, with Jean-Pierre Kérien and Nine Assia
 1952 : Monsieur de Panama by Jean de Létraz
 1956 : Oncle Job by Robert Vattier and Albert Rieux
 1956 : Via Mala after John Knittel, adaptation Paul Achard, directed by Jacques Clancy
 1957  : La Corniflorette by André Ransan, directed by Jean-Jacques Daubin
 1958 : Le Bossu after Paul Féval, adaptation Guy Haurey, directed by Jacques Dacqmine
 1958 : Prométhée 48 by Roger Garaudy

References 

Apollo
Apollo